The Brazoria County Library System operates public libraries in Brazoria County, Texas, United States.

The system has several libraries in many cities.

Branches

 Alvin Library - Alvin
 Angleton Library - Angleton
 Brazoria Library - Brazoria
 Clute Library - Clute
 Danbury Library - Danbury
 Freeport Library - Freeport
 Lake Jackson Library - Lake Jackson
 Manvel Library - Manvel
 Pearland Library - Pearland
 Pearland Westside Library - Pearland
 Sweeny Library - Sweeny
 West Columbia Library - West Columbia

External links

Brazoria
Education in Brazoria County, Texas
Angleton, Texas
Freeport, Texas
Pearland, Texas